Hashan Dumindu (born 4 July 1995) is a Sri Lankan first-class cricketer. He was part of Sri Lanka's squad for the 2014 ICC Under-19 Cricket World Cup. In November 2021, he was selected to play for the Colombo Stars following the players' draft for the 2021 Lanka Premier League.

References

External links
 

1995 births
Living people
Sri Lankan cricketers
People from Western Province, Sri Lanka
Galle Guardians cricketers
Kegalle District cricketers